Wagane Faye (born 20 November 1993) is a Senegalese professional footballer who plays as a defender for Belgian National Division 1 club RAAL La Louvière.

Club career
In the summer of 2022, Faye moved to the third-tier Belgian club RAAL La Louvière.

References 

1993 births
Living people
Senegalese footballers
Association football defenders
Génération Foot players
R.F.C. Seraing (1922) players
RAAL La Louvière players
Challenger Pro League players
Belgian Pro League players
Belgian National Division 1 players
Senegalese expatriate footballers
Expatriate footballers in Belgium
Senegalese expatriate sportspeople in Belgium